Iraida Suslova (born 16 January 1955) is a Soviet cross-country skier. She competed in the women's 10 kilometres at the 1980 Winter Olympics.

Cross-country skiing results

Olympic Games

References

External links
 

1955 births
Living people
Soviet female cross-country skiers
Olympic cross-country skiers of the Soviet Union
Cross-country skiers at the 1980 Winter Olympics
Place of birth missing (living people)